Lucknow–New Delhi Tejas Express is one of India's semi-high speed full AC Tejas Express fleet introduced by Indian Railways connecting  in Delhi and  in Uttar Pradesh. The train started its operations on 4 October 2019, on the occasion of Navaratris.

This train is India's first train operated by private operators, IRCTC, a subsidiary of Indian Railways.

Coach composition

There are 12 AC Chair Car and they can seat up to 78 passengers each (3+2) configuration and 1 Executive Class coach (in 2+2 configuration). The Executive Class coach has a seating capacity of 56 passengers and adjustable head-rests, arm support and leg support. All doors are centrally controlled.

It is designed by Indian Railways with features of LED screen display to show information about stations, train speed, etc. and will have an announcement system as well, Vending machines for tea, coffee and milk, Bio toilets in compartments as well as CCTV cameras, water level indicators, tap sensors, hand dryers, integrated braille displays, local cuisine, celebrity chef menu, WiFi, snack tables, fire & smoke detection and suppression system. On-board catering service charges are included in the fare.

Service
The train leaves Lucknow Junction at 06:10 am and reaches New Delhi at 12:25 pm. On its return journey, the train leaves Delhi at 3.40 pm and reach Lucknow at 10.05 pm.

Schedule 
The schedule for 82501/82502 Lucknow - New Delhi Tejas Express is given below:-

Other facilities
IRCTC, the operator of this train announced that in Indian rail history for the first time ever passengers will be compensated for the delay of the train. 100 will be paid to the passengers if the delay is over one hour while 250 will be paid for delays over two hours. Alongside a slew of offers like free travel insurance worth  and on-board infotainment services, doorstep baggage collection and local food are provided. But no Tatkal quota will be available for this train.

Profitability
IRCTC, the private operator spent an average of nearly 14 lakh per day to run the train, earned around 17.50 lakh daily from passenger fares.

References

External links

Tejas Express trains
Passenger trains originating from Lucknow
2019 establishments in India
Railway services introduced in 2019
Rail transport in Delhi
Privately operated trains